Nations Cup may refer to:

Association football
Africa Cup of Nations, continental association football tournament in Africa
OFC Nations Cup, also known as Oceania Nations Cup, continental association football tournament in Oceania
2011 Nations Cup, association football tournament involving Northern Ireland, Republic of Ireland, Scotland and Wales
Taça das Nações (or "Nations' Cup") association football tournament played in Brazil in 1964 to celebrate the 50th anniversary of the founding of the Brazilian Football Confederation
UEFA European Nations Cup, a traditional name for the UEFA European Football Championship
Coupe des Nations, (or "Nations' Cup") association football tournament played in Switzerland in 1930, as a counterpoint to the first FIFA World Cup

Hockey

Ice hockey 
 Nations Cup (women's ice hockey), is a women's ice hockey tournament contested every year in Germany or Switzerland

Field hockey 
 Women's FIH Hockey Nations Cup, an international women's field hockey tournament organised annually

Roller hockey 
 Nations Cup (roller hockey), is a roller hockey tournament held in Montreux each two years

Motor racing
Australian Nations Cup Championship, a national motor racing series (2000 to 2004)
F1 H2O Nations Cup, Powerboat racing

Netball
Nations Cup (netball), an annual netball competition organised by Netball Singapore
Netball Nations Cup, a four nation international netball tournament

Rugby
World Rugby Nations Cup, an international men's rugby union competition held since 2006
Women's Nations Cup, an international women's rugby union series held from 2008 to 2013

Other sports
Bofrost Cup on Ice, a figure skating competition known for many years as the "Nations Cup"
FEI Nations Cup, an equestrian showjumping competition
Nations Cup (sailing), match racing competition
Nations Cup (snooker), professional snooker tournament
World Under 23 Rowing Championships, formerly known as the Nations Cup
Nations Cup (theatre on ice), an international theatre on ice competition 
World Team Cup, international team tennis championship of the ATP, formerly known as the Nations Cup

See also 
Cup of Nations (disambiguation)
European Nations' Cup (disambiguation)